Gijs Ronnes (born 10 June 1977 in Boxmeer, North Brabant) is a male beach volleyball player from the Netherlands. He claimed the silver medal at the 2006 European Championships in The Hague, Netherlands, partnering Jochem de Gruijter. His younger brother Bram is also a professional beach volleyball player in the international circuit.

His father Frans Ronnes is mayor of Haaren.

Playing partners
 Max Backer
 Jochem de Gruijter

References

External links
 

1977 births
Living people
Dutch men's beach volleyball players
People from Boxmeer
Sportspeople from North Brabant
20th-century Dutch people
21st-century Dutch people